La Gauche (French for: The Left) may refer to:

 The Left (Luxembourg),, political party in Luxembourg
 The Left (Switzerland),, political party in Switzerland

See also
 The Left (disambiguation)